DJ Special (Japanese: ディージェイ・スペシャル, also known as 1986 Omega Tribe DJ Special) is a compilation album by 1986 Omega Tribe narrated by Hawaiian DJ Ron Wiley. The album was released on June 21, 1987 by VAP and charted at No. 3 on the Oricon charts.

Background 
The album is the third album by 1986 Omega Tribe with the song selections planned with the concept of "listening to FM radio while driving along the beach." It was based of the Kamasami Kong DJ Special in 1984, which featured Kiyotaka Sugiyama & Omega Tribe and DJ Kamasami Kong, and the Come Along album, which featured Tatsuro Yamashita and DJ Katsuya Kobayashi.

The album was not released on analog boards due to the difficulty to use while driving, and only released on cassettes and CDs. As well as being a compilation, it was structured like a radio program, including song introductions, program jingles, and directing to receive requests from listeners by phone. This pseudo-program is set to be a program of KIKI, an FM station that actually exists in Waikiki, Hawaii, and KIKI's popular DJ, Ron Wiley, is also acting under his real name.

The content was selected from three singles and the two albums, with the song "Brilliant Summer" being recorded for the alum. The song was also included in Best Remix in 1989 and in Omega Tribe History: Goodbye Omega Tribe 1983–1991 in 1991.

Track listing

Charts

References 

1987 compilation albums
Omega Tribe (Japanese band) albums